The Fair Grounds Stakes is a Grade III American Thoroughbred horse race for four-year-olds and older run over a distance of about  miles (9 furlongs) on the turf annually in mid-February at the Fair Grounds Race Course in New Orleans, Louisiana.  It currently offers a purse of $150,000.

History

The event was inaugurated on 21 February 1988 as the featured tenth race called the Fair Grounds Budweiser Breeders' Cup with sponsorship from Budweiser and the Breeders' Cup with handicap conditions for three-year-olds and older at the distance of about one and one-eighth miles. The event was won by the Irish bred five-year-old Top Guest in a time of 1:54. Top Guest had previously won the Stockholm Cup International as a three-year-old.

Budweiser ceased their sponsorship in 1995 while the Breeders' Cup continued until 2006. 

The event was upgraded in 2006 to Grade III. That same year, 2006, the event was moved to Louisiana Downs due to the after effects of Hurricane Katrina which damaged the Fair Grounds racetrack.

Two horses have won the event three times. Yukon Gold won the event three consecutive times for in 1993 through 1995. Yukon Gold's third victory was on dirt since the event was moved off the turf. Mystery Giver also won the race three times, in 2002 through 2004. 

Originally a handicap, in 2020 the conditions of the event were changed to a stakes allowance race, thus changing the name of the event to Fair Grounds Stakes.

The event has been held in mid-February since 2010 as is part of Louisiana Derby Preview Day at the New Orleans racetrack.

Records
Speed  record:
 miles – 1:47.29 Factor This   (2020)

Margins:
 lengths   –	Joyeux Danseur  (1998)

Most wins:
 3 - Yukon Gold  (1993, 1994, 1995)
 3 - Mystery Giver  (2002, 2003, 2004)

Most wins by a jockey:
 5 - Robby Albarado (1997, 1998, 2003, 2004, 2006)

Most wins by a trainer:
 3 - Hal Wiggins  (1993, 1994, 1995)
 3 - Richard R. Scherer  (2002, 2003, 2004)
 3 - Brad H. Cox  (2015, 2016, 2020)

Most wins by an owner:
 4 - Team Block  (2002, 2003, 2004, 2006)

Winners

Legend:

See also
List of American and Canadian Graded races

References

Fair Grounds Race Course
Graded stakes races in the United States
Open mile category horse races
Turf races in the United States
Horse races in New Orleans
Horse racing
Grade 3 stakes races in the United States
Recurring sporting events established in 1988
1988 establishments in Louisiana